The West African Baptist Advanced School of Theology is a Baptist theological institute, located in Lomé, Togo.

History

The school was founded in 1971 as the Baptist Pastoral School by the International Mission Board, a Baptist Missionary Agency of the United States, to serve the French West African region.

In 1999, Bachelor of Theology programs is introduced. That same year, the school take its current name, West African Baptist School of Theology.

Programs
The school offers programs in evangelical Christian theology, whose
licentiates, masters.

Partners 
The school is a partner of the Francophone Baptist denominations of West Africa.

References

External links
Official Site

Baptist seminaries and theological colleges
Seminaries and theological colleges in Togo
Educational institutions established in 1951
1951 establishments in French Togoland
Evangelicalism in Togo